Young, Dumb and Living Off Mum is a British entertainment reality series which aired on BBC Three. The series follows a group of young adults who have been waited on hand and foot their whole lives. The series sees them living together in a house and fending for themselves. Each week they must compete against each other in tough work challenges set by their parents, designed to encourage them to become more independent. After each assignment, their parents meet to watch the footage of the task and decide who, based on behaviour and performance, should be eliminated from the competition. At the end of the series, the winner receives a round-the-world trip for two people.

The show is part of BBC Three's Adult Season. All episodes are narrated by Robert Webb.

Other versions
A Swedish version called Ung och bortskämd (Young and Spoiled) began airing on SVT on 8 November 2010 and finished on 21 December. An Irish version premiered on TV3 in September 2010. An Australian remake, Young, Lazy and Driving Us Crazy, aired in 2014.

Episodes

Series 1 (2009)
Series 1 was first broadcast in July 2009.  A total of eight contestants took part in the series; Danielle Tucker, Dina Massey, Dogan Peri, Jay Tronica, Rachel Hyde, Nicola Hitchen, Orion Nurse and Sean Evans. All of the contestants lived in a house, in Lewisham, South East London, for a total of four weeks. Danielle, Dina and Dogan made it to the final of the show, which was eventually won by Danielle. Her prize was a trip for two around the world.

Series 2 (2010)
Series 2 started on Sunday 25 July and followed a new group of contestants.  The format of the show remains unchanged from the previous series. This series originally had 8 contestants but a replacement contestant, Duane Johns, was added during the second week.

Chloe was removed from the house for a violent outburst at the night time. Due to this behaviour she could not stay in the house, as she would cause more friction between fellow housemates.

Harri had walked, as she could not take it. Being told once by Chloe, that she cannot sleep in the same bed as Marc, she then eventually gave way later on and packed her bags and booked a taxi back home.

Series 3 (2011)

Filming for series 3 began on 20 March and ended on 12 April 2011. It began airing on 14 August 2011 and follows the same format as the previous series'. Just like the previous series', the series is made up of eight contestants; Jack Woodman, Ryan Lee Cox, Tom Latham, Enzo Salerno, Gracie Dudley, Sophie Simpson, Jade Franklin and Ruby-Jo Leverton. Sophie said she was planning to walk after the elimination in Episode 1 after she had been told she was eliminated. Enzo was also considering walking in Episode 2, which was the main reason for his elimination despite arguably having shown the largest attempt in the house to grow up. Tom and Jack attempted to leave at the beginning of Episode 3, yet without any money or a place to go they stayed in the house. After losing her money in Episode 4 Gracie was considering walking, yet eventually decided to stay.
In Episode 6 Ruby Jo, Tom & Ryan had to renovate a family home wherein the occupants have certain difficulties in life. Ryan Cox eventually won the series and Ruby Jo has decided to re-enter the competition after her experiences during her stay.

References

External links

2009 British television series debuts
2011 British television series endings
2000s British reality television series
2010s British reality television series
BBC Television shows
Television shows set in London
English-language television shows